{{Speciesbox
|image = 
|image_caption = 
|genus = Herniaria
|species = algarvica
|authority = Chaudhri
|status = VU
|status_system = IUCN3.1
|status_ref = 
|status2 = VU
|status2_system = IUCN3.1
|status2_ref = <ref name=iucn>{{Cite iucn |title=Herniaria algarvica' |author=Caldas, F.B. |name-list-style=amp |page=e.T162091A5534302 |date=2011 |doi=10.2305/IUCN.UK.2011-1.RLTS.T162091A5534302.en |access-date=6 April 2021}}</ref>
|synonyms = 
|synonyms_ref = 
}}Herniaria algarvica'' is a species of flowering plant in the family Caryophyllaceae, endemic to southwestern coastal Portugal. It inhabits clearings of scrub in maritime cliffs, rocks and coastal dunes.

References

algarvica
Endemic flora of Portugal
Endemic flora of the Iberian Peninsula
Plants described in 1968